Andrei Mureșanu High School is a high school in the Șcheii Brașovului neighborhood of Brașov, Romania. It is situated close to Piața Unirii and the Saint Nicholas Church. The school is named after the well-known Romanian poet Andrei Mureșanu, who composed the lyrics of the national anthem of Romania, "Deșteaptă-te, române!"

The school complex also includes an elementary and a middle school; both are situated in a nearby building.

References

Muresanu
High schools in Romania